Hsieh Chun-hui (1939–2002) was a Taiwanese politician.

Hsieh served four terms on the Taiwan Provincial Assembly and two terms on the Tainan County Council before his 2001 election to the Legislative Yuan as a member of the People First Party representing Tainan County. He died on 13 October 2002, while in office.

References

1939 births
2002 deaths
People First Party Members of the Legislative Yuan
Members of the 5th Legislative Yuan
Tainan Members of the Legislative Yuan
Tainan City Councilors